Sir William Lawrence (1818 – 18 April 1897)  was an English builder and Liberal Party politician who sat in the House of Commons in two periods between 1865 and 1885.

Biography
Lawrence was the eldest son of William Lawrence, an alderman of the City of London, and his wife Jane Clarke, daughter of James Clarke. He was a builder in London and a partner in the firm of William Lawrence and Sons Builders. In 1857 he was High Sheriff of London and Middlesex for a year and in 1863 to 1864 Lord Mayor of London. He was a Deputy Lieutenant for the City of London, a J.P. for Middlesex and Westminster and an alderman of London.

At the 1865 general election Lawrence was elected as a Member of Parliament (MP) for the City of London, but lost the seat in 1874. He was re-elected at the 1880 general election and held the seat until the next general election, in 1885, when representation was reduced from four to two under the Redistribution of Seats Act 1885. He was the last Liberal to represent the City of London.

At the 1885 general election he stood in Paddington South as an independent liberal, but was unsuccessful, winning only 7.2% of the votes.

Lawrence died unmarried at the age of 78. He is buried in the eastern roundel of Kensal Green Cemetery in London, not far from the entrance.

The address at his funeral was given by Brooke Herford, minister of Rosslyn Hill Unitarian Chapel where he, like his father, had worshipped. His brothers Sir James Lawrence, 1st Baronet and Sir Edwin Durning-Lawrence were also M.P.s. James was MP for Lambeth, Edwin for Truro. His nephew Frederick Pethick-Lawrence was a pacifist and suffragist, and later an MP.

References

External links
 

1818 births
1897 deaths
Burials at Kensal Green Cemetery
UK MPs 1880–1885
UK MPs 1865–1868
UK MPs 1868–1874
Sheriffs of the City of London
19th-century lord mayors of London
19th-century English politicians
Deputy Lieutenants of the City of London
Liberal Party (UK) MPs for English constituencies
Morden College
Members of the Metropolitan Board of Works
Members of Parliament of the United Kingdom for the City of London
High Sheriffs of Middlesex